Sean Eugene Selvaraj (born 11 April 1996) is a Malaysian footballer who plays for Malaysia Super League club Negeri Sembilan.

Club career

Early year
Born in Negeri Sembilan, Sean played for Negeri Sembilan under-21 from 2013 to 2015. He also was one of the players representing the Negeri Sembilan football in sporting events (Sukma) in Sarawak.

Negeri Sembilan
In April 2016, Negeri Sembilan head coach, Gary Phillips confirmed that Sean would be definitely promoted to Negeri Sembilan's first team. He just made 9 appearances and scored two goals in Malaysia Premier League on two seasons (2016, 2017).

Selangor
On 4 December 2017, Sean signed a one-year contract with Malaysia Super League club Selangor on a free transfer.

Negeri Sembilan 
In 2022 he returned to join the team Negeri Sembilan FC on a free transfer after spent two years with the team in 2016 and 2017. Since 2022 he has been with the team for one years and has become an important player throughout 2022. He has helped the team secure fourth place in the Malaysia Super League in 2022. It is an impressive achievement as the team has just been promoted from the Malaysia Premier League in the previous year and had shocked the other Malaysia Super League teams because Negeri Sembilan FC was considered an underdog team. He has made 12 appearances and score 2 goals during his time with Negeri Sembilan FC since 2022 and made a total of 21 appearances and score 4 goals overall for Negeri Sembilan since 2016.

International career
On 1 July 2017, Sean was called up to the Malaysia U-23 for 2018 AFC U-23 Championship qualification in 2017. Sean made his full debut on AFC qualification matches against Indonesia U-23 on 19 July 2017, playing 30 minutes in Bangkok, Thailand. The match ended with a 3–0 win for Malaysia.

Career statistics

Club

1 Includes AFC Cup and AFC Champions League.

Honours

Club
Selangor
 Malaysia FA Cup runner-up: 2018

References

External links
 

1996 births
Living people
Malaysian footballers
Selangor FA players
Negeri Sembilan FC players
Malaysia Super League players
Malaysian people of Indian descent
Malaysian people of Kristang descent
People from Negeri Sembilan
Association football wingers
Association football forwards
Southeast Asian Games silver medalists for Malaysia
Southeast Asian Games medalists in football
Competitors at the 2017 Southeast Asian Games